Olga Yegenyevna Bas (Russian: Ольга Евгеньевна Бас; born on 27 February 1964), is a politician who is serving as the senator of the legislative authority of the Luhansk People's Republic since 20 December 2022.

Biography

Olga Bas was born on 27 February 1964 in Noginsk, Kirov Oblast. In 1989, she graduated from the Kharkiv Law Institute named after F. E. Dzerzhinsky, and worked in the prosecutor's office of the Leninsky district of Luhansk, then in the regional department of justice. In 1995, she became a judge of the Leninsky District Court in Luhansk.

In 2002, she became a judge of the Criminal Chamber of the Court of Appeal of the Luhansk Oblast. By 2013, she taught at the National School of Judges of Ukraine, with the outbreak of the conflict in Donbas, she remained in the Luhansk People's Republic, since 2014 she worked at the Ministry of State Security, supervising the judicial direction. On 7 December 2017, she headed the administration of the head of the Donetsk People's Republic. She was elected a deputy of the People's Council of the Luhansk People's Republic.

On 20 December 2022, the deputies of the People's Council approved Bas as a senator of the Luhansk People's Republic, a representative of the republic's legislative body in the Federation Council, and on December 23, during a meeting of the Federation Council, she is confirmed to the chamber.

References

1964 births
Living people
20th-century Russian politicians
Ukrainian women in politics
Members of the Federation Council of Russia (after 2000)